The Coronation Honours 1911 for the British Empire were announced on 19 June 1911, to celebrate the coronation of George V which was held on 22 June 1911.

The honours were covered in the press at the time, including in The Times on 20 June 1911, listing the formal announcements in the London Gazette on the previous day.

The recipients of honours are displayed here as they were styled before their new honour, and arranged by honour, with classes (Knight, Knight Grand Cross, etc.) and then divisions (Military, Civil, etc.) as appropriate.

The Order of the Crown of India
Princess Victoria Elisabeth Augustine Charlotte, Hereditary Princess of Saxe-Meiningen
Princess Victoria Patricia Helena Elizabeth of Connaught

Order of the Garter
 Georges Adolphe-Frederic Auguste Victor Ernest Adalbert Gustave Guillaume Wellington, Grand Duke of Mecklenburgh-Strelitz
John Douglas Sutherland, Duke of Argyll, KT, GCMG, GCVO
Alexander William George, Duke of Fife, KT, GCVO

Order of the Thistle
Walter John Francis, Earl of Mar and Kellie
Donald James, Baron Reay, GCSI, GCIE

Order of St. Patrick
Anthony, Earl of Shaftesbury, KCVO
Field Marshal Horatio Herbert, Viscount Kitchener of Khartoum, GCB, OM, GCSI, GCIE

Peerages

Marquess
The Earl of Crewe, KG, created Marquess of Crewe

Earl
The Lord Loreburn, created Earl Loreburn, GCMG, Lord Chancellor
The Earl of Rosebery, KG, KT, created Earl of Midlothian
The Lord Brassey, GCB, created Earl Brassey
The Lord Curzon of Kedleston, GCSI, GCIE, created Earl Curzon of Kedleston

Viscount
The Lord Elibank, created Viscount Elibank
The Lord Knollys, GCB, GCVO, KCMG, ISO, created Viscount Knollys
The Lord Allendale, created Viscount Allendale
The Right Honourable Aretas Akers-Douglas, MP, created Viscount Chilston

Baron
The Viscount Mountgarret, created Baron Mountgarret
The Right Honourable Sir Charles Benjamin Bright McLaren, Bt., created Baron Aberconway
The Right Honourable Sir Alexander Fuller-Acland-Hood, Bt., MP, created Baron St Audries
Lieutenant-Colonel The Right Honourable Sir Arthur John Bigge, GCVO, KCB, KCSI, KCMG, ISO, created Baron Stamfordham
Sir William Thomas Lewis, Bt., KCVO, created Baron Merthyr
Sir James Lyle Mackay, GCMG, KCSI, KCIE, created Baron Inchcape
Archibald Cameron Corbett, Esq., MP, created Baron Rowallan
Thomas Gair Ashton, Esq., MP, created Baron Ashton of Hyde
Godfrey Benson, Esq., created Baron Charnwood

Privy Council

Privy Council of Ireland

Baronets

Knights Bachelor

Empire
Charles Henry Major, Esq., Chief Justice of the Colony of Fiji, and Chief Judicial Commissioner of the Western Pacific
Frederic Mackenzie Maxwell, Esq., Chief Justice of the Colony of British Honduras
Edwin Arney Speed, Esq., Chief Justice of Northern Nigeria
The Honourable Charles O′Grady Gubbins, Minister and Senator of the Union of South Africa
The Honourable Lyman Melvin Jones, Senator of the Dominion of Canada
The Honourable Arthur Robert Guinness, Speaker of the House of Representatives, New Zealand
The Honourable James Tennant Molteno, KC, Speaker of the House of Assembly of the Union of South Africa
The Honourable Frank Madden, Speaker of the Legislative Assembly, Victoria
Thomas John Wadson, Esq., Speaker of the House of Assembly of the Bermuda Islands
The Honourable Joshua Strange Williams, Pusine Judge of the Supreme Court, New Zealand
The Honourable John McCall, MD, Agent-General in London for Tasmania
The Right Honourable Allen Taylor, Lord Mayor of Sydney
Adolphe-Basile Routhier, Esq., Judge of the Vice-Admiralty Court, Quebec
William Whyte, Esq., Vice President of the Canadian Pacific Railway Company
Hugh Fort, Esq., formerly Member of the Legislative Council of the Straits Settlements

The Most Honourable Order of the Bath

Knight Grand Cross of the Order of the Bath (GCB) 
 Civil Division
Major Prince Adolphus Charles Alexander Albert Edward George Philip Louis Ladislaus, Duke of Teck, GCVO, CMG
Major Prince Alexander Augustus Frederick William Alfred George of Teck, GCVO, DSO
Edward, Baron Macnaghten, GCMG
Sir William Edward Goschen, GCMG, GCVO
Sir Charles Inigo Thomas, KCB Permanent Secretary to the Board of Admiralty
Sir Kenneth Augustus Muir Mackenzie, KCB, KC
Sir Courtenay Peregrine Ilbert, KCB, KCSI, CIE

 Military Division
Admiral of the Fleet Sir Arthur Dalrymple Fanshawe, GCVO, KCB
Admiral Sir Lewis Anthony Beaumont, KCB, KCMG
Admiral Sir Arthur William Moore, KCB KCVO, CMG
Admiral Sir Charles Carter Drury, GCVO, KCB, KCSI
Admiral Sir Wilmot Hawksworth Fawkes, KCB KCVO
Admiral Lord Charles William Delapoer Beresford, GCVO, KCB, MP
Admiral Sir William Robert Kennedy, KCB
Admiral Sir William Henry May, GCVO, KCB
General Sir Archibald Hunter, KCB, DSO, Governor and Commander-in-Chief Gibraltar
General Sir Henry John Thoroton Hildyard, KCB, Colonel, The Highland Light Infantry
General Sir Robert MacGregor Stewart, KCB, Colonel Commandant, Royal Artillery
General Sir Beauchamp Duff, KCB, KCSI, KCVO, CIE, Indian Army, Military Secretary, India Office
General Sir Henry Macleod Leslie Rundle, KCB, KCMG, DSO, Colonel Commandant, Royal Artillery, Governor and Commander-in-Chief Malta
General Sir Edward Stedman, KCB, KCIE, Unemployed Supernumerary List, Indian Army
General Sir Charles Whittingham Horsley Douglas, KCB, General Officer Commanding-in-Chief, Southern Command

Knights Commander of the Order of the Bath (KCB) 
 Civil Division
Vice-Admiral Arthur Mostyn Field, FRS
James Alfred Ewing, CB, FRS
James Brown Marshall, CB
Hay Frederick Donaldson, CB, Chief Superintendent of the Royal Ordnance Factories
Colonel Hugh, Earl Fortescue, ADC, His Majesty's Lieutenant for the County of Devonshire, President and Chairman Devonshire Territorial Force Association
Honorary Colonel Sir George Jackson Hay, Knt, CB, CMG, late 3rd Battalion, The Prince of Wales's Own (West Yorkshire Regiment)
Honorary Colonel Morgan George Lloyd, CB, late 3rd Battalion The Royal Irish Regiment
Honorary Colonel William Alexander Hill, CB, late 3rd Battalion The Gloucestershire Regiment
Colonel Edward Thomas Davenant Cotton-Jodrell, CB, Deputy Assistant Director, Territorial Force, War Office
Colonel Thomas Sturmy Cave, CB, Brigade Commander, South Midland Infantry Brigade.
Colonel Henry George Louis Crichton, ADC, late Brigade Commander, Hampshire Light Infantry
Colonel Lancelot Rolleston, DSO, Brigade Commander, Notts and Derby Mounted Brigade
Colonel Aldred Frederick George Beresford, Earl of Scarbrough, CB, ADC, Brigade Commander, Yorkshire Mounted Brigade, Chairman West Riding of Yorkshire Territorial Force Association
Sir Frederic Fitzjames Cullinan, CB Principal Clerk of the Chief Secretary's Office, Dublin Castle
James Stewart Davy, CB Chief Inspector, Poor Law Service
James Miller Dodds, CB Permanent Under-Secretary, Scottish Office
Sir Almeric William Fitzroy, KCVO
Lieutenant-Colonel Sir Charles Arthur Andrew Frederick, GCVO
Sir Francis Charles Gore Solicitor to the Board of Inland Revenue
William Graham Greene, CB assistant secretary of the Admiralty
Frederick Arthur Hirtzel, CB
Sir Robert Hunter, CB
Lieutenant-Colonel Alexander Burness McHardy, CB, RE
Sir Charles Willie Mathews
John Paget Mellor, CB
Horace Cecil Monro, CB Permanent Secretary, Local Government Board
Charles Algernon Parsons, CB, LL.D
Major Ronald Ross, CB, FRCS
Edward Peirson Thesiger, CB Clerk to House of Lords
Benjamin Arthur Whitelegge, CB, MD Chief Inspector of Factories

 Military Division
Admiral Henry Coey Cane, CB
Vice-Admiral George Fowler King Hall, CVO
Vice-Admiral Sir Alfred Wyndham Paget, KCMG
Vice-Admiral (Acting) Sir John Rushworth Jellicoe, KCVO, CB
Rear-Admiral Thomas Hounsom Butler Fellowes, CB
General William Campbell, CB, RMA
General Francis William Thomas, RMLI
Inspector-General of Hospitals and Fleets Doyle Money Shaw, CB
Inspector-General of Hospitals and Fleets Thomas Desmond Gimlette, CB
Chief Inspector of Machinery James Roffey, CB
Chief Inspector of Machinery John Harold Heffernan, CB
Paymaster-in-Chief John Samuel Moore, CB
Major-General Lord Ralph Drury Kerr, CB, Colonel 10th (Prince of Wales's Own Royal) Hussars
General George Francis Beville, CB, Unemployed Supernumerary List, Indian Army
Major-General Henry Hallam Parr, CB, CMG, Colonel, The Prince Albert's (Somersetshire Light Infantry)
Colonel and Honorary Major-General John Palmer Brabazon, CVO, CB
General Horace Moule Evans, CB, Unemployed Supernumerary List, Indian Army (Colonel 8th Gurkha Rifles)
Veterinary Colonel Francis Duck, CB (Retired), late Director-General, Army Veterinary Department
Colonel William Hugh Mortimer, CB, (Retired), late Army Pay Department
Major-General Alfred William Lambart Bayly, CB, CSI, DSO, Indian Army (Colonel, 126th Baluchistan Infantry)
Major-General John George Ramsay, CB, Indian Army (Colonel, 24th Punjabis), Commanding Bangalore Infantry Brigade
Lieutenant-General John Eccles Nixon, CB, Indian Army, Commanding 1st (Pehsawar) Division
Lieutenant-General John Plumptre Carr Glyn, Colonel Commandant, The Rifle Brigade (The Prince Consort's Own)
Major-General George Mackworth Bullock, CB, Colonel, The Devonshire Regiment, Commanding West Riding Division, Northern Command
Major-General Alexander Nelson Rochfort, CB, CMG, Lieutenant-Governor and Commanding the Troops, Jersey District
Major-General Francis Lloyd, CVO, CB, DSO, Commanding Welsh Division, Western Command
Lieutenant-General James Moncrieff Grierson, CVO, CB, CMG
Colonel and Honorary Major-General Francis Edward Mulcahy, CB, (Retired), late Army Ordnance Department, Director of Equipment and Ordnance Stores, War Office
Major-General Edward Owen Fisher Hamilton, CB, Lieutenant-Governor and Command the Troops, Guernsey and Alderney District
General Sir Laurence James Oliphant, KCVO, CB, General Officer Commanding-in-Chief, Northern Command
Lieutenant-General Frederick Walter Kitchener, CB, Governor and Commander-in-Chief, Bermuda
Major-General John Spencer Ewart, CB, ADC General, Adjutant-General to the Forces (2nd Military Member, Army Council)
Surgeon-General Adam Scott Reid, CB, Indian Medical Service (Retired)
Major-General John Blaxell Woon, CB, Indian Army, Commanding 9th (Secunderabad) Division
Lieutenant-General Charles Hamilton Des Voeux, CB, Indian Army
Lieutenant-General Alfred Astley Pearson, CB, Indian Army, (Colonel 124th Duchess of Connaught's Own Baluchistan Infantry), Commanding 3rd (Lahore) Division
Major-General Henry Montague Pakington Hawkes, CB, CSI, Indian Army
Major-General Archibald James Murray, CVO, CB, DSO, Director of Military Training, War Office
Surgeon-General William Launcelotte Gubbins, CB, MVO, KHS, Director-General, Army Medical Service
Major-General George Barker, CB, Commanding Eastern Coast Defences, Eastern Command
Major-General Herbert Napier Bunbury, CB

Companions of the Order of the Bath (CB) 

Military division
Rear-Admiral Arthur Henry Limpus
Rear-Admiral Robert Hathorn Johnston Stewart, MVO
Rear-Admiral William Lowther Grant
Rear-Admiral David Beatty, MVO, DSO
Rear-Admiral Ernest Charles Thomas Troubridge, CMG, MVO
Captain Horace Lambert Alexander Hood, MVO, DSO, RN
Captain William Osbert Boothby, MVO, RN
Captain Roger John Brownlow Keyes, MVO
Colonel James Henry Bor, CMG, ADC, RMA
Lieutenant-Colonel Algernon St. Leger Burrows, RMLI
Lieutenant-Colonel Godfrey Estcourt Matthews, RMLI
Engineer Rear-Admiral John Stocker Sanders
Inspector-General of Hospitals and Fleets Charles Cane Godding
Inspector-General of Hospitals and Fleets Arthur William May
Paymaster-in-Chief John Henry George Chapple, MVO
Paymaster-in-chief Francis Harrison Smith.
Major-General Sir Charles Fergusson Bt, MVO, DSO, Inspector of Infantry
Surgeon-General James Gaussen MacNeece, Principal Medical Officer, 8th (Lucknow) Division, India
Surgeon-General George Winsor Robinson, Principal Medical Officer Aldershot Command
Colonel Robert Megaw Ireland, CMG, Army Pay Department, Chief Paymaster War Office
Colonel (temporary Brigadier-General) Charles Rudyerd Simpson, Commanding 5th Infantry Brigade, Aldershot Command
Colonel Samuel Charles Norton Grant, C.M.G., Director General of the Ordnance Survey.
Colonel Anthony John Abdy, Commanding Royal Horse and Royal Field. Artillery, South Africa.
Colonel (temporary Brigadier-General) Herman James Shelley Landon, Commanding 3rd Infantry Brigade, Aldershot Command.
Colonel Edward John Granet, Military Attache, Rome and Berne. 
Colonel James Thomason Johnston, Half-pay.
Colonel (temporary Brigadier-General) Francis Algernon Curteis, Commanding Western Coast Defences, Western Command.
Colonel Charles Edward Hayries, Chief Engineer, Eastern Coast Defences, Eastern Command.
Lieutenant-Colonel and Brevet-Colonel Hugh Pentland Shekleton, Commanding 1st Battalion, The Prince of Wales's Volunteers (South Lancashire Regiment).
Colonel (temporary Brigadier-General) Edmund Donough John O'Brien, Commanding Potchefstroom District, South Africa.
Colonel Arthur Dashwood Bulkeley Buckley, Assistant Adjutant General, War Office.
Colonel Andrew Graham Thomson, Commandant(General Staff Officer, 1st grade), Royal Military Academy, Woolwich.
Colonel Montagu Creighton Curry, D.S.O., Commanding No. 4 District, Western Command.
Colonel (temporary Brigadier-General) Edmund John Phipps-Hornby, V.C., Commanding Royal Artillery, 4th Division, Eastern Command.
Colonel Henry Huntly Leith Malcolm, D.S.O., Half-pay.
Colonel John Edward Watson, Half-pay.
Colonel Walter Norris Congreve, V.C., M.V.O., Commandant, School of Musketry, Hythe.
Colonel (temporary Brigadier-General) William Riddell Birdwood, C.S.I., C.I.E., D.S.O., A.D.C., Indian Army, Brigade Commander, Kohat Brigade.
Colonel Frederick Charles Almon Gilpin, Assistant Director, of Supplies and Transport, Southern Command.
Colonel Kenneth Edward Lean, General Staff Officer, 1st grade, India.
Lieutenant-Colonel and Brevet-Colonel the Honourable Charles Granville Fortescue, C.M.G., D.S.O., Commanding 1st Battalion, The Rifle Brigade (The Prince Consort's Own).
Colonel (temporary Brigadier-General) George Arthur Cookson, Indian Army, Brigade Commander, Bangalore Cavalry Brigade.
Colonel Robert Arundel Kerr Montgomery, D.S.O., General Staff Officer, 1st grade, 1st Division, Aldershot Command.
Colonel John Fowle, Assistant Director of Remounts, War Office.
Colonel Francis Alexander Fortescue, Brigade, Commander, Devon and Cornwall Infantry Brigade.
Colonel Granville Roland Francis Smith, Assistant-Adjutant and Quartermaster-General, London District.
Colonel Charles William Thompson, D.S.O., General Staff Officer, 1st grade, Western Command. 
Colonel George Mackintosh, Half-pay.
Colonel (temporary Brigadier-General) Henry D'Urban Keary, D.S.O., A.D.C., Indian Army, Brigade Commander, Garhwal Brigade. 
Colonel (temporary Brigadier-General) Charles John Melliss, V.C., A.D.C., Indian Army, Brigade Commander, Fyzabad Brigade. 
Colonel (temporary Brigadier-General) Hugh O'Donnell, D.S.O., Indian Army, Brigade Commander, Bannu Brigade.
Colonel (temporary Brigadier-General) Ernest Hunter Rodwell, Indian Army, Brigade Commander, Secunderabad 2nd (Infantry) Brigade.
Colonel (temporary Brigadier – General) William Edwin Bunbury, Indian Army, General Staff, Northern Army, India.
Colonel (temporary Brigadier-General) Philip Mainwaring Carnegy, Indian Army, Brigade Commander, Abbottabad Brigade.
Colonel (temporary Brigadier-General) James Gibbon Turner, Indian Army, Brigade Commander, Risalpur Cavalry Brigade.
Colonel (temporary Brigadier-General) Edmund Boteler Burton, Indian Army.
Colonel Herbert James, Indian Army.
Colonel St. George Loftus Steele, Indian Army, Assistant Quartermaster-General, India.
Colonel Richard Boileau Gaisford, C.M.G., Assistant Quartermaster-General, Scottish Command.
Colonel Richard Makdougall Brisbane Francis Kelly, D.S.O., Commanding Royal Artillery, Southern Coast Defences, Southern Command.
Colonel Paul Rycaut Stanbury Churchward, Commanding Middlesex Infantry Brigade, Eastern Command.
Colonel John Arthur Tanner, D.S.O., General Staff Officer, 1st grade, India.
Colonel Claude Arthur Bray, C.M.G., Army Pay Department, Command Paymaster, Southern Command.
Colonel (temporary Major-General) George Macaulay Kirkpatrick, Inspector-General, Military Forces, Commonwealth of Australia.
Colonel Aylmer Gould Hunter-Weston, D.S.O., General Staff Officer, 1st grade, War Office.
Colonel Henry Ernest Stanton, D.S.O., A.D.C., Royal Artillery.
Colonel Hugh Gregory Fitton, D.S.O., A.D.C., Assistant Adjutant-General, Eastern Command. 
Colonel Charles Rutherford, C.M.G., Principal Veterinary Officer, India.
Lieutenant-Colonel and Brevet Colonel George Ralph Collier Westropp, Indian Army. 
Colonel Ernest William Stewart King Maconchy, C.I.E., D.S.O., Indian Army, Deputy Secretary, Army Department, India.
Colonel Michael Joseph Tighe, D.S.O., Indian Army.
Colonel James Marshall Stewart, A.D.C., Indian Army.
Colonel Robert Smeiton Maclagan, Superintending Engineer, 2nd grade, Public Works Department, India.
Colonel Charles Fancourt Willis, Indian Medical Service, Principal-Medical Officer, 5th (Mhow) Division.
Colonel Walter Pipon Braithwaite, Commandant (Brigadier-General, General Staff), Staff College, Quetta.
Colonel William Cross Barratt, D.S.O., Indian Army.
Colonel Vesey Thomas Bunbury, D.S.O., Half-pay.
Colonel George Benjamin Hodson, D.S.O., Indian Army.
Colonel Thomas Grainger, Indian Medical Service, Principal Medical Officer, Burma Division.
Colonel Charles Massy Mathew, D.S.O., Assistant-Director of Ordnance Stores, Southern Command.

Civil division
Inspector-General of Hospitals and Fleets Howard Todd
Fleet Surgeon Percy William Bassett-Smith
Engineer Rear-Admiral Robert Mayston
Engineer Rear-Admiral Charles Lane
Naval Instructor Arthur John Parish
Robert Edmund Froude, FRS
Arnold William Reinold, FRS
Rear-Admiral Herbert Edward Purey-Cust
Colonel Simeon Hardy Exham, RE
Commander Frederick William Vibert, RNR
Commander James Thomas Walter Charles, RNR
Commander William Hazell, RNR
Commander Rupert Edward Cecil Guinness, CMG, RNVR
Commander James, Marquis of Graham, CVO, RNVR
Commander Edward William Lloyd, RN
Major-General John Steven Cowans, M.V.O., Director-General of the Territorial Force, War Office.
Lieutenant-Colonel and Honorary Colonel Stephenson Robert Clarke, Commanding 3rd Battalion, The Royal Sussex Regiment.
Colonel Robert Campbell Mackenzie, Brigade Commander, Highland Light Infantry Brigade.
Colonel Herbert Hughes, C.M.G., Brigade Commander, 3rd West Riding Infantry Brigade.
Colonel Peter Broome Giles, Administrative Medical Officer, 1st London Division.
Frank Dudley Docker, Esq.
Colonel Henry Streatfeild, M.V.O., Vice-Chairman, Kent Territorial Force Association.
Lieutenant-Colonel James Clark, K.C., Commanding 9th (Highlanders) Battalion, The Royal Scots (Lothian Regiment), Member, City of Edinburgh Territorial Force Association.
Colonel Sir Thomas Glen Glen-Coats, Bart., His Majesty's Lieutenant for the County of Renfrewshire, President, Renfrewshire Territorial Force Association.
Frank Shoolbred, Esq.
Tonman Mosley Esq., Chairman, Buckinghamshire Territorial Force Association.
Robert Martin-Holland, Esq., Member, County of London Territorial Force Association
Colonel Joseph Henry Russell, Baron Glanusk, D.S.O., His Majesty's Lieutenant for the County of Brecknockshire; President, Brecknockshire Territorial Force Association.
Colonel James Edward Edmonds, General Staff Officer, 1st grade, 4th, Division, Woolwich.
Major-General Charles Ernest Heath, C.V.O., Director of Transport and Remounts, War Office.
Colonel Henry Capel Lofft Holden, F.R.S., Superintendent, Royal Gun and Carriage Factories, Woolwich Arsenal.
Lieutenant-Colonel Herbert Ellison Rhodes James, F.R.C.S., Royal Army Medical Corps (Retired), attached General Staff, War Office.
Major-General Cecil Frederick Nevil Macready, C.B. (Military), Director of Personal Services, War Office.
Brigadier-General Frederick Rainsford-Hannay, Director of Fortifications and Works, War Office.
Major-General Richard Matthews Ruck, Major-General in charge of Administration, Eastern Command.
Colonel Henry Charles, Viscount Hardinge, A.D.C., Commanding 6th Battalion, The Rifle Brigade (The Prince Consort's Own).
Lieutenant-Colonel and Honorary Colonel the Honourable William Charles Wordsworth Rollo (Master of Rollo), Commanding 3rd Battalion, The Black Watch (Royal Highlanders).
Lieutenant-Colonel and Honorary Colonel Henry Crosbie, Commanding 3rd. Battalion, The Manchester Regiment.
Lieutenant-Colonel and Honorary Colonel Morgan William O'Donovan (The O'Donovan), Commanding 4th Battalion, The Royal Munster Fusiliers. 
Lieutenant-Colonel and Honorary Colonel John William Merton Macartney, Commanding 2nd Battalion, The Royal Guernsey Militia.
Lieutenant-Colonel and Honorary Colonel Reginald Barclay, Commanding 3rd Battalion, The Duke of Edinburgh's (Wiltshire Regiment).
Lieutenant-Colonel and Honorary Colonel Charles Waring Darwin, Commanding 3rd Battalion, The Durham Light Infantry.
Lieutenant-Colonel Henry Edzell Morgan Lindsay, Commanding Royal Monmouthshire Royal Engineers.
Colonel George Sampson Elliston, Administrative Medical Officer, East Anglian Division.
Lieutenant-Colonel and Honorary Colonel Robert Francis Dudgeon, late 5th Battalion, The King's Own Scottish Borderers.
Lieutenant-Colonel and Honorary Colonel Joseph Alfred Bradney, Commanding 2nd Battalion, The Monmouthshire Regiment.
Lieutenant-Colonel and Honorary Colonel Philip Hugh Dalbiac, Commanding 2nd London Divisional Transport and Supply Column.
Lieutenant-Colonel and Honorary Colonel Charles Elton Longmore, Commanding 1st Battalion, The Hertfordshire Regiment.
Lieutenant-Colonel and Honorary Colonel Edward James Moore, late 20th (County of London) Battalion, The London Regiment (Blackheath and Woolwich).
Lieutenant-Colonel and Honorary Colonel the Honourable Henry Cubitt, Commanding Surrey (Queen Mary's Regiment) Yeomanry.
Lieutenant-Colonel and Honorary Colonel George Milne, Commanding 1st Highland Brigade Royal Field Artillery.
Lieutenant-Colonel and Honorary Colonel Walter Robert Ludlow, Commanding 8th Battalion, The Royal Warwickshire Regiment.
Lieutenant-Colonel and Honorary Colonel Richard Beale Colvin, C.B. (Military), late Essex Yeomanry.
Lieutenant-Colonel and Honorary Colonel Henry Adeane Erskine, Commanding Northumbrian Transport and Supply Column.
Lieutenant-Colonel and Honorary Colonel James William Greig, M.P., late 14th (County of London) Battalion, The London Regiment (London Scottish).
Lieutenant-Colonel and Honorary Colonel Thomas George Ewan, Commanding Lancashire and Cheshire Royal Garrison Artillery.
Lieutenant-Colonel and Honorary Colonel Harry Langdon, Commanding Lancashire Fortress Royal Engineers.
Lieutenant-Colonel and Honorary Colonel John Henry Woodward, late 4th Battalion, The Gloucestershire Regiment.
Lieutenant-Colonel and Honorary Colonel Edward Frewen, Commanding Royal East Kent (The Duke of Connaught's Own) (Mounted Rifles) Yeomanry.
Lieutenant-Colonel and Honorary Colonel Henry John Edwards, Cambridge University Officers Training Corps. 
Major and Honorary Lieutenant-Colonel Arthur Fanshawe Hoare, 1st Battalion, The Hertfordshire Regiment.
Walter Edward Archer, Esq.
Vincent Wilberforce Baddeley, Esq. Admiralty
Rowland Bailey, Esq., M.V.O., I.S.O. Office of Works
Ernley Robertson Hay Blackwell, Esq.
Henry Farnham Burke, Esq., C.V.O.
Herbert Simon Carey, Esq.
Charles Archer Cook, Esq.
Joseph Patrick Crowly, Esq.
Bertram Blakiston Cubitt, Esq.
Malcolm Delevingne, Esq.
Alfred Hull Dennis, Esq.
Lionel Earle, Esq., C.M.G.
Edward George Harman, Esq.
Charles Harris, Esq.
Henry Frank Heath, Esq., PhD Board of Education
Frederick George Kenyon, Esq., D.Litt.
Stanley Leathes, Esq.
Frederick Francis Liddell, Esq.
Francis Herman Lucas, Esq. India Office
Bernard Mallet, Esq.
Charles Murray Marling, Esq., C.M.G.
Roderick Sinclair Meiklejohn, Esq. Civil Service
William Grenfell Max-Muller, Esq., M.V.O. Envoy to China
Major Malcolm Donald Murray, C.V.O.
Edward O'Farrell, Esq.
Rear-Admiral Sir Charles Langdale Ottley, K.C.M.G.. M.V.O.
Edward Rigg, Esq., I.S.O.
Michael Ernest Sadler, Esq.
William Rose Smith, Esq.
Charles Henry Renn Stansfield, Esq. Director of Greenwich Hospital
Sir Henry Tanner, I.S.O. Architect
William James Dickson Walker, Esq.
George Waller Willcocks, Esq. M.I.C.E.
Joseph George Willis, Esq.

Order of Merit (OM)
Sir George Otto Trevelyan, Bart, LL.D, DCL
Sir Edward Elgar, LL.D

Order of the Star of India

Knight Grand Commander (GCSI) 
General Sir Dighton MacNaghten Probyn, VC, GCB, GCVO, KCSI, ISO

Knight Commander (KCSI) 
Krishna Govinda Gupta, CSI, Member of the Council of India

Order of Saint Michael and Saint George

Knight Grand Cross (GCMG)
Lord Denman, PC, KCVO, Governor-General and Commander-in-Chief designate of the Commonwealth of Australia
Sir George Houston Reid, KCMG, High Commissioner in London for the Commonwealth of Australia
Sir Charles Fitzpatrick, KCMG, Chief Justice of Canada
Sir Richard Solomon, KCB, KCMG, KCVO, High Commissioner in London for the Union of South Africa
Colonel Sir Frederick John Dealtry Lugard, KCMG, CB, DSO, Governor and Commander-in-Chief of the Colony of Hong Kong
Sir Gerard Augustus Lowther, KCMG, CB, His Majesty's Ambassador Extraordinary and Plenipotentiary at Constantinople
Sir Eldon Gorst, KCB, His Majesty's Agent and Consul-General in Egypt, Minister Plenipotentiary in His Majesty's Diplomatic Service

Knight Commander (KCMG) 
Sir John Michael Fleetwood Fuller, Bart, Governor of the State of Victoria
James Carroll, Native Minister and Minister of Stamp Duties of the Dominion of New Zealand
John George Findlay, KC, LL.D, Attorney-General of the Dominion of New Zealand
Sir Perceval Maitland Laurence, LL.D, Puisne Judge of the Cape of Good Hope Provincial Division of the Supreme Court of South Africe, in recognition of services as Chairman of the Delimitation Commission under the South Africa Act, 1909
Hartmann Wolfgang Just, CB, CMG, Assistant Under-Secretary of State, Colonial Office and Secretary to the Imperial Conference
Rear-Admiral William Rooke Creswell, CMG, Director of Naval Forces of the Commonwealth of Australia
John Pringle, MB, CMG, Member of the Privy and Legislative Councils of the Island of Jamaica
Major-General John Charles Hoad, CMG, Chief of the General Staff of the Military Forces of the Commonwealth of Australia
Colonel David Harris, CMG, Member of the House of Assembly of the Union of South Africa
Herbert Cecil Sloley, CMG, Resident Commissioner, Basutoland
Frederick James Clark, CMG, Member of the Executive Council and Speaker of the House of Assembly of the Island of Barbados
John Rose Bradford, MD, D.Sc, a secretary to the Royal Society
Reginald Thomas Tower, CVO, His Majesty's Envoy Extraordinary and Minister Plenipotentiary at Buenos Ayres
Walter Beaupré Townley, His Majesty's Envoy Extraordinary and Minister Plenipotentiary at Bucharest
Henry Bax-Ironside, His Majesty's Envoy Extraordinary and Minister Plenipotentiary at Sofia
Reginald Lister, CVO. His Majesty's Envoy Extraordinary and Minister Plenipotentiary at Tangier

Honorary
Abdul Hamid Halimshah ibni Adhmat Tajudin, Sultan of Kedah
Zainul-ab-din ibni Marhum Ahmad, Sultan of Terengganu

Companion (CMG) 

Captain Cecil Hamilton Armitage, D.S.O., Chief Commissioner of the Northern Territories of the Gold Coast.
Chewton Atchley, Esq., I.S.O., Librarian, Colonial Office.
James William Barrett, Esq., M.D., Member of the Council and Lecturer of the University of Melbourne.
Marcus Henry De la Poer Beresford, Esq., I.S.O., late Secretary to the Administration, Northern Nigeria.
Arthur Winbolt Brewin, Esq., Registrar-General of the Colony of Hong Kong.
Henry William Frederick Nottingham Brodhurst, Esq., Government Agent, Western Province of the Island of Ceylon.
Robert Gervase Bushe, Esq., Auditor General of the Colony of Trinidad and Tobago.
Lieutenant Herbert Alexander Child, R.N., Director of Marine, Southern Nigeria.
Arthur Ernest Collins, Esq., Principal Clerk, Colonial Office.
Colonel Robert Joseph Collins, I.S.O., Comptroller and Auditor-General, Dominion of New Zealand.
William Sayer Comissiong, Esq., Member of the Executive and Legislative Councils of the Island of Grenada.
Robert Thorne Coryndon, Esq., Resident Commissioner, Swaziland.
Lieutenant-Colonel Wilfred Bennett Davidson-Houston, Commissioner of the Presidency of Montserrat.
Robert Alexander Falconer, Esq., M.A.., LL.D., D.Litt., President of the University of Toronto.
Frederick Fitchett, Esq., LL.D., M.A., Public Trustee, Dominion of New Zealand.
Edward Thomas Grannum, Esq., Auditor-General of the Island of Barbados.
Henry Eugene Walter Grant, Esq., Colonial Secretary of the Leeward Islands.
Alfred Claud Hollis, Esq., Secretary for Native Affairs, East Africa Protectorate.
Eyre Hutson, Esq., Colonial Secretary of the Colony of Fiji.
Charles Canniff James, Esq., Deputy Minister of Agriculture for the Province of Ontario.
Benjamin Howell Jones, Esq., Member of the Executive Council and Court of Policy of the Colony of British Guiana.
Carlos Melhado, Esq., Member of the Executive Council of the Colony of British Honduras.
Roland Lyons Nosworthy Michell, Esq., Commissioner of Limassol, Cyprus.
Alan Hay Milne, Esq., Secretary to the Incorporated Liverpool School of Tropical Medicine.
Joseph Armand Patron, Esq., Chairman of the Gibraltar Exchange Committee.
Howard Lloyd Pryce, Esq., Travelling Commissioner in the Gambia.
Robert Archibald Ranking, Esq., First Police Magistrate of the State of Queensland.
Henry Nicholas Ridley, Esq., M.A., Director of Gardens and Forests, Straits Settlements.
Lionel Henry Sholl, Esq., I.S.O., Under Secretary and Government Statist of the State of South Australia.
Adam Shortt, Esq., M.A., Civil Service Commissioner, Dominion of Canada.
Arthur French Sladen, Esq., Private Secretary to the Governor-General of the Dominion of Canada.
George Smith, Esq., Colonial Secretary of the Colony of Mauritius.
Henry Richard Wallis, Esq., Assistant Deputy-Governor, Nyasaland Protectorate.
Reginald George Watson, Esq., British Resident, Selangor, Federated Malay States.
The Honourable Frank Wilson, Premier and Colonial Treasurer of the State of Western Australia.
Temistocle Zammit, Esq., M.D., Government Analyst, Public Health Department of the Island of Malta.
Edward Thomas Frederick Crowe, Esq., Commercial attaché to His Majesty's Embassy at Tokio.
Captain Edward Colpoys Midwinter, late R.E., D.S.O., Director of the Soudan Government Railways.
Dugald Christie, Esq., F.R.C.P., L.R.C.S., Head of the Medical Missionaries in China.
Commander Bertram Sackville Thesiger, of His Majesty's Navy.

Royal Victorian Order

Knights Grand Cross (GCVO)
Prince Alexander of Battenberg, KCVO
The Earl of Chesterfield
Earl Spencer
Lord Revelstoke
Sir Schomberg Kerr McDonnell, KCB, CVO
Lieutenant-Colonel Sir William Carington, KCVO, CB
Sir Edward Henry, KCB, KCVO, CSI
Colonel Sir Douglas Dawson, KCVO, CMG

Knights Commander of the Royal Victorian Order (KCVO) 
Prince Leopold Arthur Louis of Battenberg
Prince Maurice Victor Donald of Battenberg
Captain William Charles Wentworth Fitzwilliam, CVO
Commander Sir Charles Leopold Cust, Bart, CB, CMG, CIE, MVO, RN
Sir Alfred Scott Scott-Gatty, CVO, (Garter Principal King of Arms)
Sir Rufus Daniel Isaacs, KC, MP
Sir John Allsebrook Simon, KC, MP
Canon John Neale Dalton, CVO, CMG
Henry David Erskine, CVO
Major-General Alfred Edward Codrington, CVO, CB
William Patrick Byrne, CB
Major Edwin Frederick Wodehouse, CB
Bertram Dawson, MD

Commanders of the Royal Victorian Order (CVO) 

The Rt Rev Herbert Edward Ryle, D.D., Dean of Westminster.
Vaughan Nash, Esq., C.B.
Captain Bryan Godfrey Godfrey-Faussett, C.M.G., M.V.O., R.N.
Fleet Surgeon Arthur Reginald Bankart, M.V.O., R.N.
Walter Reginald Baker, Esq.
Charles Hubert Montgomery, Esq.
Milsom Rees, Esq., F.R.C.S.Edin.
Mayo Robson, Esq., D.Sc., F.R.C.S.
Colonel Granville Ronald Francis Smith

Members of the Fourth Class of the Royal Victorian Order (MVO) 

Major the Lord Charles George Francis FitzMaurice
Henry Peter Hansell, Esq., M.V.O. (5th Class)
Charles Harold Athill, Esq. (Richmond Herald)
Marcellus Purnell Castle, Esq..
Arthur William Steuart Cochrane, Esq. (Rouge Croix).
William Fairbank, Esq., M.R.C.S. 
The Rev Frederick Percival Farrar
William Francis Fladgate, Esq. 
Capt Houston French
Frederick Morris Fry, Esq. 
James Fetherstonhaugh Hamilton, Esq.
Lieut-Col Herbert Alexander St. John Mildmay
Colonel Arthur Allen Owen
Walter Peacock, Esq.

Members of the Fifth Class of the Royal Victorian Order (MVO) 

Walter Alcock, Esq., Mus.Doc.
Ernest Henry Bright, Esq.
Clifford Longden, Esq.
Campbell Gerald Hertslet MacGill, Esq.
Thomas Moore, Esq.
Francis John Sims, Esq.
Herbert Arthur Previté Trendell, Esq.
Creswell Wells, Esq.
Tansley Witt, Esq.

Imperial Service Order

Royal Red Cross
Head Sister Miss Margaret Helen Keenan, Queen Alexandra's Royal Naval Nursing Service
Head Sister Miss Katherine Mary Hickley, Queen Alexandra's Royal Naval Nursing Service

References

1911
1911 awards
1911 in the United Kingdom